Abbiss is an English surname. Notable people with the surname include:

 George Abbiss (1884–1966), English police officer
 Jim Abbiss, English record producer

References 

Surnames of English origin